Ceratagallia is a genus of leafhopper. Ceratagallia leafhoppers are found in semi-arid environments in North America, including California, Arizona, Nevada, Utah, Idaho, Colorado, New Mexico, Texas, Kansas, and Mexico.

Description 
Ceratagallia differ from other genera of leafhopper by their transversely striated pronotum and non-forked male genitalia.

Taxonomy 
Ceratagallia contains the following species:
 Ceratagallia californica
 Ceratagallia sanguinolentus
 Ceratagallia vulgaris
 Ceratagallia cinerea
 Ceratagallia semiarida
 Ceratagallia viator
 Ceratagallia coma
 Ceratagallia cristula
 Ceratagallia califa
 Ceratagallia cerea
 Ceratagallia okanagana
 Ceratagallia omani
 Ceratagallia siccifolia
 Ceratagallia calcaris
 Ceratagallia arida
 Ceratagallia tristis
 Ceratagallia vastitatis
 Ceratagallia ludora
 Ceratagallia canona
 Ceratagallia arroya
 Ceratagallia neodona
 Ceratagallia pera
 Ceratagallia dondia
 Ceratagallia lobata
 Ceratagallia nubila
 Ceratagallia pudica
 Ceratagallia grisea
 Ceratagallia artemisia
 Ceratagallia bigeloviae
 Ceratagallia brailovskyi
 Ceratagallia socala
 Ceratagallia ovata
 Ceratagallia loma
 Ceratagallia neovata
 Ceratagallia tergata
 Ceratagallia longipes
 Ceratagallia aplopappi
 Ceratagallia delta
 Ceratagallia nitidula
 Ceratagallia abrupta
 Ceratagallia nanella
 Ceratagallia robusta
 Ceratagallia loca
 Ceratagallia lupini
 Ceratagallia uhleri
 Ceratagallia siccifolius
 Ceratagallia curvata
 Ceratagallia longula
 Ceratagallia humilis
 Ceratagallia obscura
 Ceratagallia sanguinolenta
 Ceratagallia agricola
 Ceratagallia harrisi

References 

Megophthalminae
Cicadellidae genera